Several organizations give out NFL Defensive Player of the Year awards that are listed in the NFL Record and Fact Book and Total Football II: The Official Encyclopedia of the National Football League. The Associated Press (AP) has been giving the award since 1972; Pro Football Writers of America/Pro Football Weekly since 1970; and Sporting News has announced winners since 2008. The Newspaper Enterprise Association was the originator of the award in 1966. However, it became defunct after 1997. Also going defunct was the United Press International (UPI) AFC-NFC Defensive Player of the Year Awards that began in 1975.

Associated Press

The AP NFL Defensive Player of the Year Award is given by the Associated Press to the league's most outstanding defensive player at the end of every NFL season since 1971.

Pro Football Writers of America 

The Professional Football Writers of America (PFWA) is made up of sportswriters who cover the NFL and the 32 teams on a daily basis.

From 1969 to 1991, the Defensive Player of the Year was presented by Pro Football Weekly only. PFW and the Professional Football Writers of America combined their awards in 1992. Since 2013, the award was presented by PFWA alone.

Newspaper Enterprise Association

Beginning in 1966, the Newspaper Enterprise Association (NEA) annually awarded the George S. Halas Trophy to the NFL's outstanding defensive player. The winner was released via the NEA news service and also appeared in the World Almanac, which was an NEA publication. The award ran through 1996. It was considered one of the major awards and as included in the NFL Record and Fact Book and its winners still appear in the NFL's Official Encyclopedia, Total Football II.

Winners are awarded George S. Halas Trophy 
1966—             Larry Wilson, S, St. Louis Cardinals
1967— 		Deacon Jones, DE, Los Angeles Rams
1968— 		Deacon Jones, DE, Los Angeles Rams
1969— 		Dick Butkus, MLB, Chicago Bears
1970— 		Dick Butkus, MLB, Chicago Bears
1971— 		Carl Eller, DE, Minnesota Vikings
1972— 		Joe Greene, DT, Pittsburgh Steelers
1973—  	        Alan Page, DT, Minnesota Vikings
1974— 		Joe Greene, DT, Pittsburgh Steelers
1975— 		Curley Culp, DT, Houston Oilers
1976— 		Jerry Sherk, DT, Cleveland Browns
1977— 		Harvey Martin, DE, Dallas Cowboys
1978— 		Randy Gradishar, ILB, Denver Broncos
1979— 		Lee Roy Selmon, DE, Tampa Bay Buccaneers
1980— 		Lester Hayes, CB, Oakland Raiders
1981— 		Joe Klecko, DE, New York Jets
1982— 		Mark Gastineau, DE, New York Jets
1983— 		Jack Lambert, MLB, Pittsburgh Steelers
1984— 		Mike Haynes, CB, Los Angeles Raiders
1985— 		Howie Long, DE, Los Angeles Raiders/
		        Andre Tippett, OLB, New England Patriots (tie)
1986— 		Lawrence Taylor, OLB, New York Giants
1987— 		Reggie White, DE, Philadelphia Eagles
1988— 		Mike Singletary, MLB, Chicago Bears
1989— 		Tim Harris, OLB, Green Bay Packers
1990— 		Bruce Smith, DE, Buffalo Bills
1991— 	        Pat Swilling, OLB, New Orleans Saints
1992— 		Junior Seau, LB, San Diego Chargers
1993— 		Bruce Smith, DE, Buffalo Bills
1994— 		Deion Sanders, CB, San Francisco 49ers
1995— 		Bryce Paup, OLB, Buffalo Bills
1996— 		Kevin Greene, OLB, Carolina Panthers
1997— 		Dana Stubblefield, DT, San Francisco 49ers

United Press International

NFC winners

AFC winners

Football Digest

1992 - Junior Seau, MLB, San Diego Chargers
1993 - Deion Sanders, CB, Atlanta Falcons
1994 - Charles Haley, DE, Dallas Cowboys
1995 - Merton Hanks, S, San Francisco 49ers
1996 - Bruce Smith, DE, Buffalo Bills
1997 - Dana Stubblefield, DT, San Francisco 49ers
1998 - Junior Seau, MLB, San Diego Chargers
1999 - Warren Sapp, DT, Tampa Bay Buccaneers
2000 - Ray Lewis, MLB, Baltimore Ravens
2001 - Brian Urlacher, MLB, Chicago Bears
2002 - Derrick Brooks, OLB, Tampa Bay Buccaneers
2003 - Ray Lewis, ILB, Baltimore Ravens
2004 - Ed Reed, S, Baltimore Ravens

Sporting News

2008 - Albert Haynesworth, DT, Tennessee Titans
2009 - Charles Woodson, CB, Green Bay Packers
2010 - Clay Matthews, LB, Green Bay Packers
2011 - Jared Allen, DE, Minnesota Vikings
2012 - J. J. Watt, DE, Houston Texans 
2013 - Luke Kuechly, LB, Carolina Panthers
2014 - J. J. Watt, DE, Houston Texans
2015 - J. J. Watt, DE, Houston Texans
2016 - Khalil Mack, DE, Oakland Raiders
2017 - Calais Campbell, DE, Jacksonville Jaguars
2018 - Aaron Donald, DT, Los Angeles Rams
2019 - Stephon Gilmore, CB, New England Patriots
2020 - Aaron Donald, DT, Los Angeles Rams
2021 - T. J. Watt, OLB, Pittsburgh Steelers

Sports Illustrated

2008 - DeMarcus Ware, OLB, Dallas Cowboys
2009 - Darrelle Revis, CB, New York Jets
2010 - Julius Peppers, DE, Chicago Bears
2011 - Justin Smith, DE, San Francisco 49ers
2012 - J. J. Watt, DE, Houston Texans 
2013 - Robert Quinn, DE, St. Louis Rams
2014 - J. J. Watt, DE, Houston Texans

Pro Football Focus

2011 - Justin Smith, DE, San Francisco 49ers
2012 - J. J. Watt, DE, Houston Texans
2013 - J. J. Watt, DE, Houston Texans
2014 - J. J. Watt, DE, Houston Texans
2015 - Aaron Donald, DT, St. Louis Rams
2016 - Aaron Donald, DT, Los Angeles Rams
2017 - Harrison Smith, S, Minnesota Vikings
2018 - Aaron Donald, DT, Los Angeles Rams
2019 - Aaron Donald, DT, Los Angeles Rams
2020 - Aaron Donald, DT, Los Angeles Rams
2021 - Aaron Donald, DT, Los Angeles Rams

Kansas City Committee of 101

Began in 1969, the "101" is 101 of the top NFL sportswriters who have been voting on awards, such as the Defensive Player of each Conference since 1969.

NFC Defensive Player of the Year
1969— Carl Eller, Minnesota Vikings
1970— Alan Page, Minnesota Vikings 
1971—  Alan Page, Minnesota Vikings
1972— Chris Hanburger, Washington Redskins
1973— Lee Roy Jordan, Dallas Cowboys
1974—  Alan Page, Minnesota Vikings
1975— Jack Youngblood, Los Angeles Rams
1976—  Jack Youngblood, Los Angeles Rams
1977— Harvey Martin, Dallas Cowboys
1978— Randy White, Dallas Cowboys
1979— Lee Roy Selmon, Tampa Bay Buccaneers
1980— Nolan Cromwell, Los Angeles Rams
1981— Fred Dean, San Francisco 49ers
1982— No award due to players strike
1983— Dave Butz, Washington Redskins
1984— Lawrence Taylor, New York Giants
1985— Mike Singletary, Chicago Bears
1986 —Lawrence Taylor, New York Giants
1987— Reggie White, Philadelphia Eagles
1988— Mike Singletary, Chicago Bears
1989— Keith Millard, Minnesota Vikings
1990— Charles Haley, San Francisco 49ers
1991— Pat Swilling, New Orleans Saints
1992— Wilber Marshall, Washington Redskins
1993— Deion Sanders, Atlanta Falcons
1994— Deion Sanders, San Francisco 49ers
1995— Reggie White, Green Bay Packers
1996— Kevin Greene, Carolina Panthers
1997— Dana Stubblefield, San Francisco 49ers
1998— Reggie White, Green Bay Packers
1999— Warren Sapp, Tampa Bay Buccaneers
2000— La'Roi Glover, New Orleans Saints 
2001— Michael Strahan, New York Giants
2002— Derrick Brooks, Tampa Bay Buccaneers
2003— Michael Strahan, New York Giants
2004— Julius Peppers, Carolina Panthers
2005— Brian Urlacher, Chicago Bears
2006— Brian Urlacher, Chicago Bears
2007— Patrick Kerney, Seattle Seahawks
2008— DeMarcus Ware, Dallas Cowboys
2009— Charles Woodson, Green Bay Packers
2010— Clay Matthews, Green Bay Packers
2011— Jared Allen, Minnesota Vikings
2012— Aldon Smith, San Francisco 49ers
2013— Luke Kuechly, Carolina Panthers
2014— Richard Sherman, Seattle Seahawks
2015— Aaron Donald, St. Louis Rams
2016— Landon Collins, New York Giants
2017— Aaron Donald, Los Angeles Rams
2018— Aaron Donald, Los Angeles Rams
2019— Chandler Jones, Arizona Cardinals
2020— Aaron Donald, Los Angeles Rams
2021― Micah Parsons, Dallas Cowboys 

AFC Defensive Player of the Year
1969— Bobby Bell, Kansas City Chiefs
1970— Mike Curtis, Baltimore Colts 
1971— Willie Lanier, Kansas City Chiefs
1972— Joe Greene, Pittsburgh Steelers
1973— Dick Anderson, Miami Dolphins
1974— Joe Greene, Pittsburgh Steelers
1975— Mel Blount, Pittsburgh Steelers
1976— Jack Lambert, Pittsburgh Steelers
1977— Lyle Alzado, Denver Broncos
1978— Randy Gradishar, Denver Broncos
1979— Mike Reinfeldt, Houston Oilers
1980— Lester Hayes, Oakland Raiders
1981— Joe Klecko, New York Jets
1982— No award due to players strike
1983— Doug Betters, Miami Dolphins
1984— Kenny Easley, Seattle Seahawks
1985— Andre Tippett, New England Patriots
1986— Deron Cherry, Kansas City Chiefs
1987— Bruce Smith, Buffalo Bills
1988— Cornelius Bennett, Buffalo Bills
1989— Michael Dean Perry, Cleveland Browns
1990— Bruce Smith, Buffalo Bills
1991— Derrick Thomas, Kansas City Chiefs
1992— Cortez Kennedy, Seattle Seahawks
1993— Rod Woodson, Pittsburgh Steelers
1994— Greg Lloyd, Pittsburgh Steelers
1995— Bryce Paup, Buffalo Bills
1996— Bruce Smith, Buffalo Bills
1997— Carnell Lake, Pittsburgh Steelers
1998— Junior Seau, San Diego Chargers
1999— Jevon Kearse, Tennessee Titans
2000— Ray Lewis, Baltimore Ravens
2001— Ray Lewis, Baltimore Ravens
2002— Jason Taylor, Miami Dolphins
2003— Ray Lewis, Baltimore Ravens
2004— Ed Reed, Baltimore Ravens
2005— Dwight Freeney, Indianapolis Colts
2006— Jason Taylor, Miami Dolphins
2007— Bob Sanders, Indianapolis Colts
2008— James Harrison, Pittsburgh Steelers
2009— Darrelle Revis, New York Jets
2010— Troy Polamalu, Pittsburgh Steelers
2011— Terrell Suggs, Baltimore Ravens
2012— J. J. Watt, Houston Texans
2013— Robert Mathis, Indianapolis Colts
2014— J. J. Watt, Houston Texans
2015— J. J. Watt, Houston Texans
2016— Khalil Mack, Oakland Raiders
2017— Calais Campbell, Jacksonville Jaguars
2018— J. J. Watt, Houston Texans
2019— Stephon Gilmore, New England Patriots
2020— T. J. Watt, Pittsburgh Steelers
2021― T. J. Watt, Pittsburgh Steelers

See also 
Defensive Player of the Year Award (NFC and AFC) (Kansas City Committee of 101 Awards) (since 1969)
Newspaper Enterprise Association NFL Defensive Player of the Year Award (defunct)
NFL Defensive Rookie of the Year Award
UPI AFL-AFC Player of the Year (defunct)
UPI NFC Player of the Year (defunct)
List of National Football League awards

References

External links
NFL Defensive Player of the Year at CBSSportsline.com
NFL Defensive Player of the Year at The Times Leader website
 at NFL.com News

National Football League trophies and awards
American football mass media